Tomi may refer to:

 Constanța, a city in Romania, also known as Tomis or Tomi
 Tomi, Okayama, a village in Japan
 Tōmi, Nagano, a city in Japan
 Tomi (name), a given name (including a list of people with the name)
 Tomi Village, a fictional Okinawan village that was the primary setting of the 1986 American motion picture The Karate Kid Part II

See also
 Tomie